London attack may refer to any of the following attacks that have occurred within London, London metropolitan area, City of London, Lundenwic, Londinium, or County of London:

Actuated attacks
 List of terrorist incidents in London
1973 Old Bailey bombing
 1982 Hyde Park and Regent's Park bombings
 1983 Harrods bombing
 1992 Baltic Exchange bombing
 1993 Bishopsgate bombing
 1996 Docklands bombing
 1999 London nail bombings
 7 July 2005 London bombings
 2017 London attack, several attacks
2020 Streatham stabbing
London Bridge attack, several attacks on the London bridge
Westminster attack, attacks in the City of Westminster or Westminster; part of London
 Second World War bombings of London by Nazi Germany's Luftwaffe, see The Blitz
 First World War bombings of London by Imperial Germany, see German strategic bombing during World War I
 1381 Raid on London, see Wat Tyler's Rebellion
 1066 Battle of Southwark, see also Battle of Hastings
 3rd century raids by Saxon pirates, see History of London
 AD 60 sacking of Londinium by the Iceni

Attempted attacks
 Gunpowder Plot (1605) of Guy Fawkes et al.
 21 July 2005 London bombings

See also
 Battle of Brentford (disambiguation) in what is now West London
 The Battle of London (WWII propaganda film)
 London, Ontario truck attack